DYO Boya Fabrikaları Sanayi ve Ticaret A.Ş. is an İzmir, Turkey-based company founded at Bornova in 1954 by Durmuş Yaşar and his two sons Selçuk Yaşar and Selman Yaşar – with managerial and technological assistance from Sadolin & Holmblad of Denmark.

DYO, Sadolin ve Yaşarin, and DYO ve Sadolin 

DYO Boya Fabrikaları Inc. is an İzmir, Turkey-based company founded in 1954, originally named Durmuş Yaşar ve Oğulları Boya, Vernik ve Reçine Fabrikaları A.Ş., and based on licensing from Sadolin & Holmblad of Denmark. DYO stands for Durmuş Yaşar ve Oğulları (Durmuş Yaşar & Sons).

In 1957, Sadolin ve Yaşarin A.Ş. (Sadolin & Yaşarin) was founded to produce resins for paint production – based on licensing from Sadolin & Holmblad. This company became in 1962 DYO ve Sadolin Sentetik Selülozik Boya ve Vernik Fabrikaları A.Ş. (DYO & Sadolin) – in short DYOSAD, and at that time DYOSAD began producing industrial paints for metal, plastic and wood as well as automotive refinishes based on licensing from Sadolin & Holmblad. In 1967, DYOSAD made a Harris Brush factory, and in 1968, DYOSAD began producing and marketing inks – on licensing from Sadolin & Holmblad.

The cooperation between the Yaşar family and Sadolin & Holmblad dates back to before the Second World War, when Durmuş Yaşar in 1938 began to import paint from Sadolin & Holmblad, who had itself had exported paint to Turkey since 1919. From the beginning DYO and later Sadolin ve Yasarin and DYOSAD the joint ventures were run by Selçuk Yaşar (oldest son of Durmuş Yaşar) – in close cooperation with Dan Alexander MacGregor Sadolin, (the only son of Gunnar Asgeir Sadolin, the founder of Sadolin & Holmblad), who was joint president and international CEO of Sadolin & Holmblad.

In 1979, 25 years after the first factory establishment, DYO and DYOSAD in Turkey had become bigger than the domestic paint and ink activities in Denmark of Sadolin & Holmblad – in terms of both net revenue, net profit and number of employees. However, DYO and DYOSAD never counted for more than 10% of the net revenue, net profit or number of employees of the entire Sadolin & Holmblad  group, which were active with more than 60 factories sites in over 40 countries, and had sales in more than 100 countries.

Ownership and structural changes 

Originally DYO was owned 75% personally by Durmus Yaşar (and from 1967 Yaşar Holding) and 25% personally by Dan Alexander MacGregor Sadolin of Sadolin & Holmblad. Originally Sadolin ve Yaşarin – later DYOSAD – was owned 75% by DYO – from 1967 Yaşar Holding – and 25% by Sadolin & Holmblad. In 1982, Sadolin & Holmblad increased its shareholding several times first to 37.5% and then to 43.5% – while the remaining shares were owned by Yaşar Holding.

In 1987, Sadolin & Holmblad was taken over by Nobel Industries of Sweden – and became a part of its global paint and adhesives business are Casco Nobel.  In 1994 Nobel Industries was taken over by Akzo of the Netherlands – forming AkzoNobel, and in 1995 AkzoNobel sold its entire shareholding in DYO ve Sadolin to Yaşar Holding, and in 2000, DYOSAD merged into DYO – together with Bayrakli Boya and Dewilux Boya, and for the first time all the paint activities of Yaşar Holding was gathered in one company, DYO – with exception of Yaşar-BASF Otomotive Boya and DYO Inks.

Organization 

The board of directors of DYO has over the years consisted of among others Durmuş Yaşar, his two sons Selçuk Yaşar and Selman Yaşar, and his grandson Selman Yaşar, as well as Ali Nail Kubali – representing Yaşar Holding as well as Dan Alexander MacGregor Sadolin (1954–1974) and then Jörgen Mölvang (1974–1995) – representing Sadolin & Holmblad of Denmark.

The board of directors of DYOSAD has over the years consisted of among others Durmuş Yaşar, his two sons Selçuk Yaşar and Selman Yaşar, and his grandson Selim Yaşar], as well as Ali Nail Kubali – representing Yaşar Holding as well as Dan Alexander MacGregor Sadolin (1958–1974), Ferd Aage Small (1958–1960), Bent Löbger (1960–1966), Jörgen Mölvang (1966–1995), Erik Lars Christian Smith-Petersen (1974–1986), Mogens Hugo (1986–1991), and Ove Mattsson from president and CEO of Casco Nobel, then Nobel Industries, and member of the executive board of AkzoNobel (1991–1995) – all representing Sadolin & Holmblad of Denmark.

At DYO and DYOSAD the first managing director was Selçuk Yaşar (1954–1968), while the first professional managing director was Vacit Tümer (1968–1975), and the first technical director was Selman Yaşar (1954–1968), while the first professional technical director was Erik Lars Christian Smith-Petersen (1968–1970).

Other Yaşar-Sadolin family relations 

Peter Asgeir MacGregor Sadolin, the only son of Dan Alexander MacGregor Sadolin and Bodil Mayland Sadolin, was first personal assistant to Selçuk Yaşar (1965–66) and thereafter project manager for the Harris Brush project and the DYOSAD Ink project (1966–1967) at DYOSAD (before becoming deputy general manager for Türk Tuborg Bira ve Malt, a Yaşar Holding joint venture with Carlsberg, in 1967–1968).

Hanne Sadolin, wife of Peter Asgeir MacGregor Sadolin, was an industrial laboratory specialist at the Automotive Laboratories at DYOSAD (1965–1966), joining from a similar position at Sadolin & Holmblad.

Selim Yaşar, the only son of Selçuk Yaşar, was the personal assistant to Jörgen Mölvang, then president and CEO of Sadolin & Holmblad (1980–1981).

Nikolaj Asgeir MacGregor Sadolin – called Nick MacGregor Sadolin, the only son of Peter Asgeir MacGregor Sadolin and Hanne Sadolin, has later been export division manager at DYOSAD (1992-1993), and he worked for both Yaşar Holding and Yaşar University in 2008–2012.

Funda Demirayak Sadolin, the later wife of Nick MacGregor Sadolin, was employed by DYOSAD (1988 to 1993) – latest as an executive secretary to the board of management. Mehmet Demirayak, the father of Funda Demirayak Sadolin, was employed at DYOSAD as a factory worker (1970–1998).

Selçuk Alexander MacGregor Sadolin – called Sam MacGregor Sadolin, the only child of Nick MacGregor Sadolin and Funda Demirayak Sadolin, was born in Izmir, Turkey, and he is named in honor of Selçuk Yaşar and Dan Alexander MacGregor Sadolin.

The Yasar and Sadolin families together with Yasar Holding, Sadolin & Holmblad and Carlsberg founded the company Danish-Turkish Investment Company Ltd. in 1972 to construct the large Altınyunus (Golden Dolphin) Hotel at Çeşme, a sea-side resort town on the extreme western tip of Turkey, on the Aegean Sea opposite the Greek island of Chios and west of Izmir, in 1972. The hotel went into operations in 1974, and had the capacity of 1100 beds and the largest conference facilities then.

Anne-Suzette Sadolin, the only daughter of Dan Alexander MacGregor Sadolin and Bodil Mayland Sadolin and a Danish artist was among the artists who decorated the hotel. For many years several of her weavings could be seen in the lobby. In 1986, Danish-Turkish Investment Company Ltd. was wound up and the Danish owned shares in Altınyunus were sold to Yasar Holding.

Since Sadolin & Holmblad during these years was a multinational group with more manufacturing operations on more than 60 sites in over 40 countries (until the group were integrated into AkzoNobel), the Sadolin family's direct involvement in DYO and DYOSAD was rather unusual.

Yaşar-BASF Otomotive Boya 

In 1992, DYOSAD sold its automotive refreshing to Yaşar Holding, which made a joint venture with the German chemical group BASF regarding automotive refinishes, and Yaşar-BASF Otomotive Boya was founded  becoming a 100% owner. The company became there by an associated company to Yaşar Holding. In 2008, BASF acquired Yaşar Holding's 50% shareholding in 2008, making Yaşar-BASF Otomotive Boya, which at the same time change its name to BASF Car Refinishes Coatings, a 100% subsidiary of BASF.

DYO Inks 

In 1992, DYOSAD separated its inks operations into DYO Sadolin Inks Manufacturing & Trade – in short DYO SADOLIN Inks. DYO SADOLIN Inks was owned 50.5% by Sadolin & Holmblad's predecessor Nobel Industries and 49.5% by DYOSAD. At the same of the merger of DYO and DYOSAD in 2000, Yaşar Holding acquired both DYOSAD's 49.5% and AkzoNobel's 50.5% shareholding in DYO SADOLIN Inks, and the company changed its name to DYO Inks Manufacturing & Trade – making it a 100% owned subsidiary Yaşar Holding and thereby a sister company to the new DYO (the paint business).

Today 

DYO is part of Yaşar Holding. DYO is one of the leading paint producers in Turkey, along with Filli Boya, Marshall Boya, and Polisan Boya. DYO is also the first company founded as part of Yaşar Holding, which since have been one of the flagship of. Yaşar Holding is a conglomerate that owns many companies in a wide spectrum of sectors.

Along with the other paint companies under Yaşar Holding using the DYO brand, the company develops and produces a large number of paint products ranging from household paint to high-end nano-technology paints. The company operates two factories, in İzmir and Kocaeli, with 734 employees. The company is TSE-EN-ISO 9001:2000 certified.

Organization 

DYO Boya Fabrikaları Inc.'s major business segments are;

 coil coatings
 construction (household) paints
 marine paints
 metal industry paints
 furniture paint and varnishes
 polyester and synthetic resins

External links
 DYO Boya Fabrikaları Co. official site
 Yaşar Holding Paint and Chemicals Group

Turkish brands
Chemical companies established in 1954
Chemical companies of Turkey
Companies listed on the Istanbul Stock Exchange
Companies based in İzmir
Paint manufacturers
1954 establishments in Turkey